Jones v. North Carolina Prisoners' Labor Union, 433 U.S. 119 (1977), was a United States Supreme Court case where the court held that prison inmates do not have a right under the First Amendment to join labor unions.

See also
 First Amendment
 Prison labor
 Prisoners' rights
 Turner v. Safley

References

External links
 

Labor relations in the United States
Penal labor in the United States
United States Supreme Court cases
United States Supreme Court cases of the Burger Court
United States freedom of association case law
United States public employment case law
Penal system in North Carolina
1977 in United States case law
Labor relations in North Carolina